SSOP may refer to:

 Sanitation Standard Operating Procedures
 Shrink Small-Outline Package